Ed or Edward Flanagan may refer to:

Ed Flanagan (American football) (born 1944), American football player
Ed Flanagan (athlete) (1910–1978), American hammer thrower
Ed Flanagan (baseball) (1861–1926), American baseball player
Ed Flanagan (politician) (1950–2017), American politician
Edward Flanagan (actor) (1880–1925), American comedic actor
Edward J. Flanagan (1886–1948), Irish-American Roman Catholic priest
Edward Vance Flanagan, birth name of American actor Dennis O'Keefe (1908–1968)